Chümoukedima District is the 15th district of the Indian state of Nagaland. It was created on 18 December 2021. The district headquarter is located in the municipality of Chümoukedima.

History 
On 2 December 1997, a notification from the order of the Government of Nagaland under the then-Chief Minister S. C. Jamir declared the erstwhile-Dimapur Sub-Division of Kohima District as a full-fledged District with Chümoukedima as its district headquarter.

The Government then initiated the construction of a new Deputy Commissioner's Office Complex at Chümoukedima with the old Additional Deputy Commissioner's Office Complex at Dimapur continuing to temporarily serve the new district. But over the years there were stiff oppositions from various Dimapur-based Civil Society Organizations (CSOs) to shift the district headquarter to Chümoukedima.

On 30 September 2021, the Dimapur-based CSOs called for a total bandh in Dimapur to show resentment over the Government's order for shifting of various branches/cells to the newly built DC Office Complex at Chümoukedima and a mass rally was organized by the CSOs in Dimapur on 5 October.

The Government of Nagaland in response revoked its order to shift the DC Office and on 18 December 2021, Dimapur District was split into three separate districts—Chümoukedima, the existing Dimapur and Niuland.

The now-Chümoukedima District has the same boundaries as the former Dhansiripar, Medziphema and Seithekema sub-divisions of Dimapur District with 19 towns and villages previously falling under Seithekema EAC placed under Dimapur District.

Geography 
The Chathe River flows through the district which later joins the Dhansiri River in Assam.

Climate
The climate is sub-tropical with a monsoon season.

Administration 
The district covers three administrative circles, which are Chümoukedima–Seithekema, Dhansiripar and Medziphema. The district has 3 legislative assembly constituencies. These are Ghaspani-1 Assembly constituency, Ghaspani-2 Assembly constituency and Dimapur-III Assembly constituency.

Divisions 
Seithekema Sub-division
 Aoyim
 Bade
 Chekiye
 Chümoukedima (Chümoukedima Municipality, Chümoukedima Village and New Chümoukedima Village)
 Diezephe
 Diphupar (Diphupar Village and Diphupar 'B')
 Ikishe
 Khopanala
 Khriezephe
 Kirha
 Mürise
 Naga United
 Seithekema (Seitheke 'A', Seitheke 'B', Seitheke 'C' and Seitheke Old)
 Seluophe
 Shokhuvi
 Singrijan
 Sodzülhou
 Sovima
 Tenyiphe-I
 Tenyiphe-II
 Thilixü
 Toulazouma
 Tsithrongse
 Unity
 Urra
 Vidima
 Virazouma
 5th Mile Model
 7th Mile Model
 7th Mile Village
 Tir

Medziphema Sub-division
 Bungsang
 Khaibung
 Medziphema (Medziphema Town, Medziphema Village and New Medziphema)
 Molvom
 Piphema
 Pherima
 Rüzaphema
 Sirhima
 Sochünoma
 Thekrejüma
 Tsüüma

Dhansiripar Sub-division
Dhansiripar

Demographics 
According to the 2011 census of India the then Chümoukedima circle of Dimapur District had a population of 125,400.

Attractions
Chümoukedima District is home to the Nagaland Zoological Park, which is a  zoo established in 2008.

Diezephe Craft Village is a craft village supervised by the Nagaland Handloom and Handicrafts Development Corporation Limited. The aim of the craft village is to promote the rich arts, handloom and handicrafts of the state. Rare craftsmanship, wood and bamboo craft can be seen at Diezephe.

North East Zone Cultural Centre is one of the several regional cultural centres established by the Government of India to preserve and promote traditional cultural heritage of North East India.

Parks and resorts
Appu Park
Aqua Mellow Park
Green Park
Niathu Resort
Noune Resort

Education

Colleges 

C-Edge College
Mount Mary College
National Institute of Technology
National Research Centre on Mithun
Oriental Theological Seminary
Patkai Christian College
Tetso College

Universities 

ICFAI University
St. Joseph University

Healthcare
The Christian Institute of Health Sciences and Research (Referral Hospital) is located at 4th Mile, Chümoukedima District.

Festivals
There are several festivals held in Chümoukedima District.
 Musik-A Festival
 Niathu Group Sports Festival

Sports 
The Nagaland Cricket Association Stadium is located in Sovima.

Transportation

Air 

Rail 

Road 
The National Highway 2 (NH2) & National Highway 129A (NH129A) and also the Asian Highway 1 (AH1) & Asian Highway 2 (AH2) passes through the district.

See also 
 Nagaland

References

External links 

Districts of Nagaland
2021 establishments in Nagaland